Frank W. King (April 24, 1912 – April 28, 1988) was a Democratic Leader and member of the Ohio Senate.  He represented the 11th District, consisting of the majority of Toledo, Ohio, from January 3, 1967, to January 13, 1969.

References

Presidents of the Ohio State Senate
Democratic Party Ohio state senators
Politicians from Toledo, Ohio
1912 births
1988 deaths
20th-century American politicians